Baxley is a city in Appling County, Georgia, United States. As of the 2020 census, the city had a population of 4,942. The city is the county seat of Appling County.

History
Baxley was first settled as a result of the Macon and Brunswick Railroad being built through Appling County in 1870. Originally, it was a railroad depot known as Station Number 7, but soon was named Baxley (after one of the community's first settlers, Wilson Baxley of North Carolina). Baxley incorporated in 1875.

Geography

Demographics

2020 census

As of the 2020 United States census, there were 4,942 people, 1,436 households, and 1,068 families residing in the city.

2010 census
As of the 2010 United States Census, there were 4,400 people living in the city. The racial makeup of the city was 51.7% White, 35.3% Black, 0.1% Native American, 1.3% Asian, 0.1% from some other race and 0.8% from two or more races. 10.6% were Hispanic or Latino of any race.

2000 census
At the census of 2000, there were 4,150 people, 1,567 households, and 1,048 families living in the city. The racial makeup of the city was 57.28% White, 37.93% African American, 0.22% Native American, 0.60% Asian, 3.16% from other races, and 0.82% from two or more races. Hispanic or Latino of any race were 7.23% of the population.

There were 1,567 households, out of which 33.2% had children under the age of 18 living with them, 43.3% were married couples living together, 18.5% had a female householder with no husband present, and 33.1% were non-families. 28.9% of all households were made up of individuals, and 13.4% had someone living alone who was 65 years of age or older.  The average household size was 2.56 and the average family size was 3.15.

In the city, the population was spread out, with 27.6% under the age of 18, 10.4% from 18 to 24, 26.7% from 25 to 44, 20.8% from 45 to 64, and 14.5% who were 65 years of age or older.  The median age was 35 years. For every 100 females, there were 91.1 males.  For every 100 females age 18 and over, there were 84.9 males.

The median income for a household in the city was $24,441, and the median income for a family was $30,648. Males had a median income of $28,087 versus $16,250 for females. The per capita income for the city was $14,321.  About 21.6% of families and 24.4% of the population were below the poverty line, including 31.0% of those under age 18 and 26.3% of those age 65 or over.

Economy
The Edwin I. Hatch Nuclear Power Plant is located north of the city along U.S. Route 1, on the banks of the Altamaha River. It is the area's largest employer.

International Forest Products Limited operates a sawmill employing over 50 people.

Education 
Appling County students in K-12 grades are in the Appling County School District, which consists of four elementary schools (three include a pre-school), a middle school and a high school. The district has 210 full-time teachers and over 3,303 students.
Altamaha Elementary School
Appling County Primary School
Appling County Elementary School
Fourth District Elementary School
Appling County Middle School
Appling County High School

Notable people
Robert Butler, painter best known for his portrayals of the woods and backwaters around Florida's Everglades; member of the African-American artists' group The Highwaymen
Byron Buxton, Major League Baseball outfielder; second overall pick (drafted by the Minnesota Twins) in the 2012 MLB draft; 2022 All-Star
Dexter Carter, running back for San Francisco 49ers and New York Jets from 1990 to 1996; born in Baxley and graduated from Appling County High School
Frankie King, NBA guard for Los Angeles Lakers (1995); born in Baxley
The Lacs, country/rap music group; from Baxley
Caroline Miller, Georgia's first Pulitzer Prize-winning novelist; received the award for Lamb in His Bosom in 1934
Jamie Nails, NFL guard for Buffalo Bills (1997–2000) and Miami Dolphins (2002–2003); born in Baxley
Janisse Ray, author of Ecology of a Cracker Childhood (1999), a memoir about growing up in Baxley which includes description of the ecosystem of the vanishing longleaf pine that once covered the area
Carl Simpson, defensive tackle for Chicago Bears (1993–1997), Arizona Cardinals (1998–1999), and Las Vegas Outlaws (2001)
Harry Skipper, defensive back in the CFL, Montreal Concordes and Saskatchewan Roughriders, 1983–1989
Vonzell Solomon, nicknamed Baby V, singer and actress
Michael Timpson, wide receiver for New England Patriots (1989–1994), Chicago Bears (1995–1996), and Philadelphia Eagles (1997); born in Baxley

References

External links

 City of Baxley official website

Cities in Georgia (U.S. state)
Cities in Appling County, Georgia
County seats in Georgia (U.S. state)
1875 establishments in Georgia (U.S. state)
Populated places established in 1875